is former a Japanese professional baseball player. He played the entirety of his career with the Chiba Lotte Marines in Japan's Nippon Professional Baseball.

External links
Satozaki Official Site (Japanese)

 Career statistics - NPB.jp 

1976 births
2006 World Baseball Classic players
Baseball people from Tokushima Prefecture
Baseball players at the 2008 Summer Olympics
Chiba Lotte Marines players
Living people
Nippon Professional Baseball catchers
Olympic baseball players of Japan